Krzysztof Stefan Michałkiewicz (born 26 September 1953 in Oborniki Śląskie) is a Polish politician. He was elected to the Sejm on 25 September 2005, getting 11,246 votes in 6 Lublin district as a candidate from the Law and Justice list.

See also
Members of Polish Sejm 2005-2007

External links
Krzysztof Michałkiewicz - parliamentary page - includes declarations of interest, voting record, and transcripts of speeches.

1953 births
Living people
People from Oborniki Śląskie
Members of the Polish Sejm 2005–2007
Law and Justice politicians
Members of the Polish Sejm 2007–2011
Members of the Polish Sejm 2011–2015